K57 or K-57 may refer to:

 K-57 (Kansas highway)
 , previously HMS Sundew (K57) when with the Royal Navy
 Potassium-57, an isotope of potassium